Folklore is the fourth and final studio album by 16 Horsepower, released in 2002.

As indicated by its name, most of the material on the album is drawn from traditional folk music. Only four songs ("Hutterite Mile," "Blessed Persistence," "Beyond the Pale" and "Flutter") are original compositions.

Track listing

Charts

External links

2002 albums
16 Horsepower albums
Jetset Records albums